Charles A. Herb (September 21, 1844 – October 18, 1895) was an American merchant and politician.

Born in Wurtemberg, Germany, Herb emigrated with his family in 1852 to the United States and settled in New York City, in Fosterburg, Illinois, and then in Alton, Illinois. Herb served in the Union Army during the American Civil War. Herb was a merchant and lived in Alton, Illinois. Herb served on the Madison County, Illinois Board of Commissioners. He also served on the Alton city council and was the mayor of Alton. In 1895, Herb served in the Illinois State Senate and was a Republican. Herb died in his home in Alton, Illinois from a stroke.

Notes

External links

1844 births
1895 deaths
German emigrants to the United States
People from Alton, Illinois
People of Illinois in the American Civil War
Businesspeople from Illinois
County commissioners in Illinois
Illinois city council members
Mayors of places in Illinois
Republican Party Illinois state senators
19th-century American politicians
19th-century American businesspeople